Sete de Setembro Esporte Clube, commonly known as Sete de Setembro, is a professional football (soccer) team in Garanhuns, Pernambuco, Brazil, founded on September 7, 1950. In the current season, they are playing in the top-tier of Pernambuco Football, the Campeonato Pernambucano. The team is not very traditional, but has played in the following editions of the first division:
1982 to 1994
2008 and 2009

History
Founded on September 7, 1950., Sete de Setembro won the Campeonato Pernambucano Second Level in 1995.

Stadium
Sete de Setembro play their home games at Gigante do Agreste. The stadium has a maximum capacity of 18,000 people.

Current squad

Achievements
 Campeonato Pernambucano Second Level:
 Winners (1): 1995

References

External links
 The team's official website

Association football clubs established in 1950
Football clubs in Pernambuco
1950 establishments in Brazil